Devario assamensis is a large danionin from the Mirik area of India. It grows to 6 inches and has a deep-red stripe along the length of its body, as well as the more usual yellow and blue stripes.

References

External links
 Devario assamensis

Devario
Fish described in 1984